Savant Lake is an unincorporated place and community in Unorganized Thunder Bay District in northwestern Ontario, Canada.

History
The town was originally named after a civil engineer in charge of building the railroad, Bucke. In 1928, another town of the same name was discovered in Ontario, Canada.  At that time, the name of the lake north of the town, Lake Savant, became the town's official name.

In 1901, Gold was discovered on Lake Savant. Therefore, in 1905, the Saint Anthony Goldmine located south of the town opened. It serviced the town until it was closed in 1941.

In 1913, CN Savant Lake railroad station was built.  Until 1959, the main form of transportation was dog teams until Ontario Highway 599 was completed. In 1973, Hydro (electricity) was brought in.

Transportation
Savant Lake is on Ontario Highway 599, roughly halfway between Ignace and Pickle Lake. The community is also connected to Sioux Lookout via Ontario Highway 516, and is the proposed northern terminus of an extension of Ontario Highway 811, if the extension is ever built.

Savant Lake is on the Canadian National Railway transcontinental main line, between Fowler to the west and Staunton to the east. Savant Lake railway station is on the line and is served by Via Rail transcontinental Canadian trains.

Local media

Television
 CBWDT-03 (channel 8) (CBC)
 CICA-63 (channel 10) (TVO)

See also
Northern District School Area Board
Ojibway Nation of Saugeen

References

Communities in Thunder Bay District
Local services boards in Ontario